Behnken is a surname. Notable people with the surname include:

Bob Behnken (born 1970), American astronaut and engineer
John William Behnken (1884–1968), American church leader

Surnames of German origin